Princeton is a city in and the county seat of Bureau County, Illinois, United States. The population was 7,832 at the 2020 census.

Princeton is part of the Ottawa Micropolitan Statistical Area.  Due to its location where Interstate 80 meets the Amtrak system, as well as its well-preserved main street and historic housing stock, Princeton has become a popular satellite town for Chicago and the Quad Cities.

History
Bureau County was a New England settlement. The original founders of Princeton consisted entirely of settlers from New England. These people were "Yankees," descended from the English Puritans who settled New England in the 1600s. They were part of a wave of New England farmers who headed west into what was then the wilds of the Northwest Territory during the early 1800s. Most of them arrived as a result of the completion of the Erie Canal. When they arrived in what is now Bureau County there was nothing but a virgin forest and wild prairie; the New Englanders laid out farms, constructed roads, erected government buildings and established post routes. They brought with them many of their Yankee New England values, such as a passion for education, fueling the establishment of many schools, as well as staunch support for abolitionism. They were mostly members of the Congregationalist Church though some were Episcopalian. 

Culturally Bureau County, like much of northern Illinois, would be culturally very continuous with early New England culture for most of its history. During the time of slavery, it was a stop on the Underground Railroad at the home of Owen Lovejoy.

The name of Princeton was supposedly determined by drawing from a hat:

Princeton's former nickname was "The City of Elms" because of the large number of elm trees the city had during the middle of the 20th century. However, an epidemic struck the elm trees of Princeton in the mid-1960's and killed off almost every elm. Soon after, Princeton's slogan was changed to "Where Tradition Meets Progress".

Now, the slogan is "A Short Drive that Takes you Far."

Geography
Princeton is located at  (41.378481, −89.466924).

Climate

Demographics

As of the 2020 census there were 7,832 people, 3,453 households, and 2,047 families residing in the city. The racial makeup of the city was 91.60% White, 1.12% African American, 0.37% Native American, 1.29% Asian, 0.14% Pacific Islander, 1.11% from other races, and 4.37% from two or more races. Hispanic or Latino of any race were 4.75% of the population.

There were 3,453 households, out of which 41.15% had children under the age of 18 living with them, 43.96% were married couples living together, 12.08% had a female householder with no husband present, and 40.72% were non-families. 36.20% of all households were made up of individuals, and 20.59% had someone living alone who was 65 years of age or older. The average household size was 2.74 and the average family size was 2.13.

The city's age distribution consisted of 19.9% under the age of 18, 6.7% from 18 to 24, 20.1% from 25 to 44, 25.3% from 45 to 64, and 27.8% who were 65 years of age or older. The median age was 47.8 years. For every 100 females, there were 77.7 males. For every 100 females age 18 and over, there were 76.6 males.

The median income for a household in the city was $51,844, and the median income for a family was $66,473. Males had a median income of $41,096 versus $23,266 for females. The per capita income for the city was $31,187. About 8.5% of families and 13.7% of the population were below the poverty line, including 24.9% of those under age 18 and 5.1% of those age 65 or over.

Economy

Princeton's major employers include L.W. Schneider, Inc. Firearms Components Manufacturer, Ace Hardware Retail Support Center, LCN Closers, (a division of Allegion), MTM Recognition, formerly Josten's, makers of several world championship rings including the 2005 Chicago White Sox, all of the Chicago Bulls Championships, and the 1985 Chicago Bears. Champion Pneumatic manufactures air compressors, Pioneer Hi-Bred International (DuPont Co) and Perry Memorial Hospital.

Princeton's Main Street is lined with independent shops and restaurants.  The south end, or downtown, is the historic retail center of town and still contains the city's only movie theater (The Apollo), the courthouse, the Bureau County Historical Society, historic Matson library building, main bank offices, as well as more service-oriented businesses.  The north end, also referred to as The Art District, is located about a mile uptown, north, and contains its own business district, park, and the city's historic Amtrak depot.  In the past several years this area has undergone a transformation with the addition of upscale clothing stores and the restoration of a historic hotel building.

Major event

Each year the city of Princeton holds its annual Homestead Festival the second weekend in September. There are usually over one hundred entries in the parade. The homestead festival hosts a variety of events including the famous pork chop barbeque, a beer garden with local bands, children's events, craft show, and tasting booths.
The festival, which began in 1971 as a celebration of the restoration of the Owen Lovejoy Homestead, now comprises a weekend of food, celebration, and the famous Homestead Parade.

Transportation

U.S. Route 6, U.S. Route 34, and Illinois Route 26 all run through Princeton.

Amtrak, the national passenger rail system, provides service to Princeton, operating the California Zephyr, the Illinois Zephyr, the Carl Sandburg and the Southwest Chief each daily in both directions between Chicago and points west from Princeton.

Education
Princeton is home Princeton High School, the oldest township high school in the state, founded in 1867. Its mascot is the Tiger.  The high school enrollment fluctuates between 550 and 650 students. The school recently finished adding on an addition to meet the students' needs. The new addition houses a larger library as well as several new classrooms. The school is home to the Frank and Marion Rathje track which hosts high school football and track and field teams from around the region.

Library

Princeton's library history dates back to March 1886 when a location for the library was decided upon and secured. The first library was located at the building at what now is 529 South Main Street. In 1890 the Matson Public Library, located on South Main, was first opened for use by the public. It remained in use for 22 years. In 1912 the construction of larger Matson Public Library building was begun. It was located at 15 Park Avenue East. On March 21, 2006, a referendum was passed for the renovation of 698 East Peru Street, formerly known as Bogo's, to become Princeton Public Library. The library is located on East Peru Street (U.S. Route 6). In March 2009, the Princeton Public Library was one of only three libraries in the state of Illinois to host Between Fences, an exhibit sponsored by the Smithsonian Institution Traveling Exhibits Service (SITES) and the Illinois Humanities Council. Additional exhibits include Bookstock: Celebrating 40 Years of Woodstock, and Cherry Mine Disaster Revisited, a showcase commemorating the lives lost during the Cherry Mine Disaster of 1909.

Notable people 

 William Bascom, folklorist, anthropologist
 E. Leslie Conkling, educator and Illinois state legislator
 James E. Dabler, Illinois state representative and businessman
 Henry C. Doolittle, state assemblyman from Wisconsin
 William Dyke, Wisconsin judge and politician
Aleta Fenceroy, LGBT activist and musician
 Virgil Fox, one of the greatest organists of the 20th Century
 Billy Garrett, auto racer
 Gary Green, guitarist for the band Gentle Giant
 Thomas P. Gunning, dentist and Illinois state senator
 Madison Gonterman, head football coach at Indiana University 1896–97
 Kathryn Hays, television actress (birth name Kay Piper), was on As The World Turns from 1972 to 2010. 
 Frank Fernando Jones, Iowa state legislator
 Keith Knudsen, drummer with the Doobie Brothers
 Owen Lovejoy, Congressman, key supporter of Abraham Lincoln, and a leader in the Underground Railway movement to free slaves
 Asa Mercer, founder of the University of Washington
 Bruce Nickells, harness racing driver and trainer; grew up in Princeton
 Ben Parr, author of Captivology, former co-editor of Mashable and columnist for CNET
 Joseph R. Peterson lawyer and Illinois state legislator
 Robert Petkoff, noted Broadway and television Actor, graduated from Princeton High School
 Joseph "Joe" Ruklick, NBA basketball player with the Philadelphia Warriors
 Eliza Suggs, temperance activist
 Josh Taylor, actor in Days of Our Lives and television features, including The Hogans TV series for 6 years.
 Justin Tranchita, actor and artist
 William V. Thompson, bowler
 Richard Widmark, Oscar-nominated actor of 61 movies, he was senior class President when he graduated from Princeton High School
 Milo Winter, children's book artist
 Nick Young, radio newscaster with CBS and WBBM

Media

Radio stations
 WZIV 90.7 FM
 WZOE 98.1 FM
 WZOE 1490 AM

References

External links

City of Princeton, Illinois – official website
Princeton Tourism Bureau – official website
Princeton Chamber of Commerce – official website

 
Cities in Bureau County, Illinois
Cities in Illinois
Populated places on the Underground Railroad
County seats in Illinois
Ottawa, IL Micropolitan Statistical Area
Populated places established in the 1830s
1830s establishments in Illinois